Vanessa Lemm  was previously vice-president and Executive Dean of the College of Humanities, Arts and Social Sciences at Flinders University. She is Chief Editor of the journal, Nietzsche Studien and published on the topics of Friedrich Nietzsche and Michel Foucault. She was the Executive Dean, Faculty of Arts and Education at Deakin University (2021-2022).

Career

Before moving to Australia, Lemm was Director of the Institute of Humanities at the Diego Portales University in Santiago de Chile and DAAD Visiting Professor at the Institute for Philosophy at the University of Potsdam, Germany.

At the University of New South Wales she was professor of philosophy and head of the School of Humanities and Languages for more than four years. During this time she was elected Fellow of the Royal Society of New South Wales (FRSN).

Bibliography
 Lemm V; Vatter M, (eds.), 2014, The Government of Life: Foucault, Biopolitics and Neoliberalism, Fordham University Press, New York
 Lemm V, 2013, Nietzsche y el pensamiento político contemporáneo, Fondo de cultura económica, Santiago de Chile
 Lemm V, 2012, Nietzsches Philosophie des Tieres, Diaphanes Verlag, Berlin/Zürich
 Lemm V, (ed.), 2010, Michel Foucault: neoliberalismo y biopolítica, Ediciones Universidad Diego Portales, Santiago de Chile
 Lemm V; Ormeño J, (eds.), 2010, Hegel, pensador de la actualidad, Ediciones Universidad Diego Portales, Santiago de Chile
 Lemm V, 2009, Nietzsche's Animal Philosophy: Culture, Politics and the Animality of the Human Being, Fordham University Press, New York

See also
Biopolitics

References

External links
 Professor Vanessa Lemm: What do we owe one another? New directions in thinking about community
 Vanessa Lemm

20th-century Australian philosophers
21st-century Australian philosophers
Academic staff of the University of New South Wales
Academic staff of Flinders University
Continental philosophers
Living people
Political philosophers
Phenomenologists
Heidegger scholars
Nietzsche scholars
Alumni of King's College London
The New School alumni
University of Paris alumni
Academic staff of Diego Portales University
Hermeneutists
Academic staff of the University of Potsdam
Fellows of the Royal Society of New South Wales
Year of birth missing (living people)